San Francisco is one of the original bitmap typefaces for the Apple Macintosh computer released in 1984. It was designed by Susan Kare to mimic the ransom-note effect and was used in early Mac software demos and Apple company fliers. An official TrueType version was never made, and San Francisco was rendered obsolete with the arrival of System 7.

See also

 Samples of display typefaces

References

Apple Inc. typefaces
Display typefaces
Typefaces and fonts introduced in 1984
Typefaces designed by Susan Kare